"The Soup Nazi" is the 116th episode of the NBC sitcom Seinfeld, which was the sixth episode of the seventh season. It first aired in the United States on November 2, 1995.

The Soup Nazi is also the nickname of the eponymous character, Yev Kassem, played by Larry Thomas. The term "Nazi" is used as an exaggeration of the strict regimentation he demands of his patrons (cf. grammar Nazi. Elaine in particular comes into conflict with Kassem, while Jerry and George spar with each other over Jerry's affectionate behavior with his girlfriend.

Plot
Jerry, George and Elaine visit a new soup stand. Jerry explains that the owner, Yev Kassem, is known as the "Soup Nazi" due to his insistence on a strict manner of behavior while placing an order, but his soups are so outstandingly delicious that the stand is constantly busy. En route, Elaine notices a man on the sidewalk with an armoire for sale. She forgoes the soup in favor of buying it. However, her building superintendent informs her that furniture move-ins are not allowed on Sundays, so she asks Kramer to watch the armoire and promises to get soup from Kassem for him in return. While she is away, two men intimidate Kramer and steal the armoire.

At the soup stand, George complains about not receiving bread with his meal. When he presses the issue, George's order is taken away and his money returned. On a subsequent visit, George buys soup, but Elaine, having scoffed at Jerry's advice on how to order, draws Kassem's ire and is banned for a year.

Jerry and his girlfriend Sheila visit the soup stand. Kassem is repulsed by their kissing, so Jerry disavows Sheila to stay on Kassem's good side. Jerry talks about the breakup with George, who expresses disgust at Jerry and Sheila's baby talk and public displays of affection. Undeterred, Jerry makes up with Sheila at Monk's. George tries to teach him a lesson by behaving similarly with Susan, but this only leads to escalating affection between the couples as Jerry and George struggle to out-disgust each other. Susan is charmed by George's public show of affection and continues to mirror this behavior. Sensing George's discomfort at this, Jerry gloats by informing him that he and Sheila have broken up again.

Kramer, who has befriended Kassem, tells him about the armoire theft. Kassem offers him an armoire he has in storage as a replacement. Elaine is elated and goes to Kassem to thank him. When Kassem learns the armoire was for Elaine, he says he would rather have destroyed it than give it to her. Vowing revenge, Elaine returns to her apartment with Jerry, where they discover Kassem's soup recipes in the armoire. Elaine returns to the soup stand and confronts Kassem with the recipes, stating her intent to publicize them.

Jerry encounters Newman, who is running to get a pot from his apartment. Newman tells him that because of what Elaine said to Kassem, he is giving away whatever soup he has left, closing down his stand, and moving to Argentina. Jerry runs towards the soup stand.

Production
"The Soup Nazi" was Spike Feresten's first credited Seinfeld episode as a writer. The idea for the episode arose when Feresten told Jerry Seinfeld and Larry David about New York soup vendor Al Yeganeh, who was nicknamed "The Soup Nazi". Seinfeld and David laughed and said, "That's a show. Do that as your first show". Feresten's inspiration for the armoire subplot was a New York apartment building where he had lived, which forbade moving furniture on certain days. The armoire thieves were written as homosexual because Larry David decided that "Only gay guys would steal an armoire". At the time Feresten wrote the episode, both he and Seinfeld were dating women who would use affectionate baby talk with them, which led to the Jerry/Sheila story.

The first cast table reading for "The Soup Nazi" was held on September 28, 1995, and it was filmed before a studio audience on October 3. In the episode, Elaine (Julia Louis-Dreyfus) references Scent of a Woman. Louis-Dreyfus had never seen the film, but Seinfeld suggested she do an impersonation of Al Pacino's character and showed her how.

The character

The Soup Nazi was portrayed by Larry Thomas. Thomas, who did not realize that the character was based on a real person, received the inspiration for his portrayal from watching Lawrence of Arabia and studying Omar Sharif's accent.

The Soup Nazi has a cameo in the Seinfeld series finale, in which his true name is revealed. He is a witness in the case against Seinfeld, Elaine, George and Kramer. He tells Hoyt about how he banned Elaine from his shop, only for her to return and ruin his business, forcing him to move to Argentina (paralleling the Ratlines used by the real Nazis). Elaine angers him by smugly claiming, "His soup wasn't all that good anyway."

Inspiration

The character was inspired by Ali "Al" Yeganeh, an Iranian American soup vendor who ran Soup Kitchen International in New York City, eventually turning it into the chain The Original Soup Man. Yeganeh has stated on numerous occasions that he is very offended by the "Soup Nazi" moniker.

According to writer Spike Feresten, Jerry Seinfeld and several members of the production team went to Soup Kitchen International for lunch weeks after "The Soup Nazi" aired. Upon recognizing Seinfeld, Yeganeh went into a profanity-filled rant about how the show had "ruined" his business, demanding an apology. Seinfeld allegedly gave what Feresten describes as "the most sarcastic apology I've ever seen anyone give." Feresten has also said that some of the episode's encounters in the soup line, such as Elaine slapping her hands on the counter and telling the Soup Nazi he looks like Al Pacino, were based on scenes he witnessed at Yeganeh's real-life soup outlet.

According to Nora Ephron's DVD commentary, the first pop culture reference to Yeganeh (though not by name) seems to have come years before the Seinfeld episode, in the 1993 movie Sleepless in Seattle. In the film, a character playing a writer pitches a story for the lifestyle section of The Baltimore Sun to their editor: "This man sells the greatest soup you have ever eaten, and he is the meanest man in America. I feel very strongly about this, Becky; it's not just about the soup."

Legacy
Thomas's portrayal of the Soup Nazi earned him a nomination for the Primetime Emmy Award for Outstanding Guest Actor in a Comedy Series in 1996.

Advertising

Like Jackie Chiles, the Soup Nazi character (played by Thomas) has appeared in commercials after the end of the series.

 In an advertisement by the corporate lobbying group Center for Consumer Freedom, he denies food to people he considers to be too fat.
 In June 2015, Thomas collaborated with Pepsi Max to promote their Top Street Food Project in Israel. According to the website, "US actor Larry Thomas, the notorious Soup Nazi from the hit series “Seinfeld,” roams the streets of Tel Aviv in a new Pepsi Max commercial, striking fear into the hearts of Israeli salesmen and women as he searches for the perfect meal and demands a suitable beverage to quench his thirst."
 Thomas appeared, in character, along with Jerry Seinfeld in a television commercial for Acura that aired during the 2012 Super Bowl. In the advertisement, Seinfeld is trying to bribe an ordinary guy to get an Acura, offering him soup from The Soup Nazi, who happily offers "Soup for you!". After Jay Leno beat Jerry Seinfeld in bribing the ordinary guy, the Soup Nazi was seen with Jerry, an alien, and a "Munchkin" at a restaurant where they are angered at Jay Leno's actions.
 In 2013, Serbu Firearms refused to sell their model BFG-50A semi-automatic .50 rifles to the New York City Police Department after the passage of the NY SAFE Act that classified their weapon as an assault rifle. Following their refusal to sell the rifles, Serbu had T-shirts printed with an image of the Soup Nazi character with the words "No Serbu For You". Thomas, a gun control advocate, contacted Facebook and the T-shirt printers to have the shirts removed. Serbu has since removed the image of Thomas and replaced it with one of their founder Mark Serbu.

In popular culture
 Larry Thomas appeared as himself in the Scrubs episode "My Self-Examination." He denies he is the Soup Nazi when asked by J.D. (Zach Braff), who then tricks him into saying the catchphrase "No soup for you!" by asking him "What is [the catchphrase] again? It's like, 'You're out of luck in the soup department...'"
 Rapper Wale used lines from the episode as an introduction and outro to his song "The Soup" on his 2010 mixtape More About Nothing. He acts as the Soup Nazi and uses the soup chef's catchphrase "No soup for you!"
 In the sitcom Arrested Development, the crooked housing entrepreneur George Bluth Sr. is charged with signing a development deal with Saddam Hussein, despite the embargo against Iraq. Bluth claims that he acted in good faith, mistakenly believing that Hussein was Larry Thomas because of his resemblance to the Soup Nazi. This gets referenced in a later episode, where Thomas appears in the role as a political decoy for Saddam Hussein who has lost his job because of the American invasion of Iraq.

In-person promotions
 Larry Thomas has used the character to promote soup kitchens for the homeless.
 In July 2012, the "Seinfeld Food Truck" embarked on an eight-stop United States tour. The truck, driven by Larry Thomas, handed out free soup along with other Seinfeld-related food items: Snapple, Twix, Junior Mints, black and white cookies and muffin tops.
 Thomas was hired by Yeganeh's company in July 2015 to portray the Yev Kassem character as promotion for Soupman products.

Other
 The episode inspired an actual soup chain, Soup Nutsy, which opened in 1996 in New York City. Though it had no official connection to, or endorsement from, Seinfeld or its creators, it included specific Seinfeld references such as describing two of its soups as "Jerry's Favorite" and "Kramer's Favorite", respectively. In 1997 it was bought by Franchise Concepts. , a few of its locations remain in Toronto, Ontario in Canada.
 In August 2009, Albert Gonzalez was convicted for robbery, being the most prolific hacker of credit cards (130 million). He operated on the Internet using the handle "Soupnazi".
 The 2009 Seinfeld: A XXX Parody was inspired by The Soup Nazi.

References

External links
 

Seinfeld (season 7) episodes
1995 American television episodes